Mormon Channel is also the name of a waterway in Stockton, California.

The Latter-day Saints Channel (formerly the Mormon Channel) is an over the air and Internet radio station owned and operated by the Church of Jesus Christ of Latter-day Saints (LDS Church). It is based in Salt Lake City, Utah.

Broadcasting 24/7 from facilities at the LDS Church's headquarters, Latter-day Saints Channel broadcasts over the Internet via the station website and over the HD2 and HD3 channels of seven FM stations: KIRO-FM in Seattle, KSL-FM in Salt Lake City, KTAR-FM in Phoenix, WARH in St. Louis, WSHE-FM in Chicago, KOSI-FM in Denver, and WYGY in Cincinnati.  KIRO, KSL, KOSI and KTAR are owned by Bonneville International, itself owned by the LDS Church; WARH, WSHE-FM, and WYGY are owned by Hubbard Broadcasting, but were owned by Bonneville as well until 2011. KSWD in Los Angeles formerly aired the network on HD4 until the station's sale to Entercom.

History 

The network was officially launched on May 18, 2009 as The Mormon Channel.  As of 2015, it is also available via iPhone and Android apps and on YouTube.  The apps include video and audio content and four radio feeds, while the YouTube channel features primarily video content (the audio-only programming has not been included on YouTube).  All the audio streams are also available via alternate means, such as TuneIn or mp3 feeds.

Latter-day Saints Channel audio and video content can also be accessed on OTT platforms. You can find Video-on-demand (VOD) and live video and audio Broadcasts and shows on web-connected platforms that include Apple TV, Fire TV, Android TV, and Roku.

On November 14, 2011, the music feed was launched, drawing primarily from Deseret Book's music offerings, along with many independent artists who are members of the LDS Church.  There are some exclusives, such as music commissioned by the LDS Church, an example of which is the 2015 Mutual Theme album 'Embark', only available via download on the youth pages of the churchofjesuschrist.org website.

In July 2014, a channel was launched to play exclusively music recorded by the Mormon Tabernacle Choir, promotional announcements by the Choir say 'Powered by the Mormon Channel'.

On September 17, 2019, as part of an organization-wide effort to focus on the church's full name, the channel was changed to "The Latter-day Saints Channel."

Programming 
Programming is produced by LDS Church departments and other associated organizations.  These may include interviews, programs about church doctrines, sermons from the church's general conference, rebroadcasts of Music and the Spoken Word, and other programs.

References

External links

Bonneville International
Internet radio stations in the United States
Media of the Church of Jesus Christ of Latter-day Saints
Properties of the Church of Jesus Christ of Latter-day Saints
Radio stations established in 2009